Koumac Airport is an airport in Koumac, New Caledonia .

Airlines and destinations

Airports in New Caledonia